Rafael Lucas Cardoso dos Santos (born 5 February 1998) is a Brazilian footballer who plays as a left back for Orlando City of Major League Soccer.

Club career 
Santos developed in the academy of Mirassol, making his senior debut for the club on 2 July 2017 in the 2017 Campeonato Paulista, playing the full 90 minutes against Ferroviária in a 2–1 defeat. He scored his first goal on 27 August 2017, the opening goal in a 4–2 win over Penapolense in the same competition.

In 2018, he joined Cruzeiro, initially on loan. He made 27 appearances for the club's under-20 team including in the 2018 U-20 Copa Libertadores. On 14 August 2018, Santos made his first team debut for the club as a 76th-minute substitute for David in a 2–0 Série A defeat to Vasco da Gama. Having joined Cruzeiro permanently in 2019, Santos went on loan for spells with Chapecoense, Inter de Limeira and Ponte Preta in Série B and later with Coritiba in Série A. He made a combined 106 senior appearances while in Brazil in all competitions.

On 5 January 2023, Santos joined American Major League Soccer club Orlando City ahead of the 2023 season on a two-year contract with an additional two club option years.

Career statistics 
.

Honors
Chapecoense
Série B: 2020

Cruzeiro
Série B: 2022

References

1998 births
Living people
Brazilian footballers
Association football defenders
Mirassol Futebol Clube players
Cruzeiro Esporte Clube players
Orlando City SC players
Associação Chapecoense de Futebol players
Associação Atlética Internacional (Limeira) players
Associação Atlética Ponte Preta players
Coritiba Foot Ball Club players
Campeonato Brasileiro Série A players
Campeonato Brasileiro Série B players
Sportspeople from Londrina
Brazilian expatriate footballers
Brazilian expatriate sportspeople in the United States